Kota Marudu is a federal constituency in Kudat Division (Kudat District and Kota Marudu District), Sabah, Malaysia, that has been represented in the Dewan Rakyat since 2004.

The federal constituency was created in the 2003 redistribution and is mandated to return a single member to the Dewan Rakyat under the first past the post voting system.

Demographics 
https://ge15.orientaldaily.com.my/seats/sabah/p

History

Polling districts 
According to the gazette issued on 31 October 2022, the Kota Marudu constituency has a total of 58 polling districts.

Representation history

State constituency

Current state assembly members

Local governments

Election results

References

Sabah federal constituencies